Dome Mountain is the highest peak in the Washakie Range in the U.S. state of Wyoming. Dome Mountain is in the Washakie Wilderness of Shoshone National Forest. The Washakie Range is one of the southern groups of mountains within the Absaroka Range, the other being the Owl Creek Mountains.

References

Mountains of Hot Springs County, Wyoming
Mountains of Wyoming
Shoshone National Forest